Kate Newby (born 1979) is an artist from New Zealand.

Background 
Newby was born in 1979 in the Auckland region of New Zealand. She attended the Elam School of Fine Arts, receiving a BFA in 2001, an MFA in 2007, and a PhD in 2015. The title of her doctoral thesis was Casualness: it's not about what it looks like it's about what it does. Newby lives and works in Brooklyn, New York and Auckland.

Career 
Newby is a mixed materials installation artist. She creates her installations based on their site and setting, often disused urban environments. Using commonplace materials such as pebbles, nails, and rope, her work explores the details of everyday life.

Newby was a member of the Auckland artist space Gambia Castle. She is represented in New York by the Laurel Gitlen gallery and in Auckland by Michael Lett.

Newby's work was exhibited at the 21st Sydney Biennale (2018), at the Brussels Biennal (2008), among other important arts festivals.  Work by Newby is held by the Auckland Art Gallery Toi o Tāmaki.

Exhibitions 

 2008 Show me, don’t tell me (group show), Brussels Biennial 1, Brussels
 2008 Thinking with your body, Gambia Castle, Auckland
 2008 Academy (with Ryan Moore), TCB, Melbourne
 2008 Many directions, as much as possible, all over the country, 1301 PE, Los Angeles
 2011 I'll follow you down the road, Hopkinson Mossman, Auckland
 2011 I'm just like a pile of leaves, Auckland Art Gallery Toi o Tāmaki, Auckland
 2013 Let the Other Thing In, Fogo Island Gallery, Fogo Island
 2013 Maybe I won’t go to sleep at all,  La Loge, Brussels
 2014 Portmanteaux (with Nick Austin, Bill Culbert, Pup Culbert, Mateo Tannatt),  Hopkinson Mossman, Auckland
 2015 Lunch Poems (with Joanna Margaret Paul), Hopkinson Mossman, Auckland
 2016 Big Tree. Bird’s Eye, Michael Lett, Auckland
 2016 Every day I make my way (with Talia Chetrit, Moyra Davey, Barbara Kasten), Minerva, Sydney
 2017 Let me be the wind that pulls your hair, curated by Michelle Grabner, Artpace, San Antonio
 2018 Nothing that's over so soon should give you that much strength, curated by Mathijs van Geest, Hordaland Kunstsenter, Bergen
 2018 A puzzling light and moving. (Part I), lumber room, Portland, OR 
 2018 Nothing that's over so soon should give you that much strength, curated by Mathijs van Geest, Hordaland Kunstsenter, Bergen
 2018  I can't nail the days down, curated by Juliane Bischoff, Kunsthalle Wien, Vienna 
 2019 Wild was the night, Institut d’Art Contemporain, Villeurbanne, France
 2019 A puzzling light and moving. (Part II and Part III), lumber room, Portland, OR
 2019 Bring Everyone, Fine Arts, Sydney, Sydney
 2020 As far as you can, Feuilleton, Los Angeles

Awards 
In 2012, Newby won the Walters Prize with her work Crawl out your window (first shown at Gesellschaft für aktuelle Kunst, Bremen). The juror of the prize was the curator and writer Mami Kataoka. 

Also in 2012, Newby held a residency at the International Studio & Curatorial Program in New York, funded by Creative New Zealand. She has also been an artist-in-residence at Fogo Island Arts in 2013; Artpace San Antonio in 2017;  Chinati Foundation in Marfa, Texas, in 2017; Joan Mitchell Foundation, New York, in 2019.

References

Further reading 
Artist files for Kate Newby are held at:
 Angela Morton Collection, Takapuna Library 
 Te Aka Matua Research Library, Museum of New Zealand Te Papa Tongarewa 
 Fine Arts Library | Te Herenga Toi The University of Auckland Libraries and Learning Services 
 E. H. McCormick Research Library, Auckland Art Gallery Toi o Tāmaki

External links 
 Official website

New Zealand artists
New Zealand women artists
Living people
1979 births
Elam Art School alumni
People from the Auckland Region